The Church of St. Nicholas is an Eastern Orthodox Church in the Bulgarian capital of Sofia.

The church was built in the 13th century by Kaloyan the sebastocrator as a small family church on today's Kaloyan Street behind the Rila Hotel. It is assumed that the church was erected on the site of the surviving parts of the palace complex that had once stood there which was built during the Roman Empire and accommodated Constantine the Great. Today these parts are preserved and can be seen in the authentic underground walls of the temple.

Each year hundreds of Sofians visit this small chapel to be blessed by the saints. Its feast day is on December 6.

See also
List of churches in Sofia

References

Sofia, St Nicholas
Nicholas